Lanka is a 2006 Indian Malayalam-language crime-thriller drama film directed by A. K. Sajan released in the year 2006. The film stars Suresh Gopi and Mamta Mohandas in the lead roles.

Plot

Sravan (Suresh Gopi) is a captain in Indian Navy fighting in Sri Lanka against the Tamil guerillas. He manages to kill hundreds of guerillas in the operations launched by the Indian Peace-Keeping Force (IPKF).

Post-operations, he decides to live in Lanka. Now he is a womaniser who goes about his task with gusto. He is stinkingly rich who owns a number of palatial bungalows. Sravan has a psychic problem too. He had been abandoned by his actress mother. Then came another blow when his wife ran away with her lover.

Sravan's daring operations against the Tamil guerillas incur the wrath of the Liberation Tigers of Tamil Ealam (LTTE). They are out to bump him off.

Into his life enters Lanka (Mamta Mohandas) who is a gypsy girl. Sravan rapes her but ends up marrying her unaware of the fact that she is from the LTTE stronghold out to seek revenge on behalf of the Tamils.

She almost succeeds in her plans. But Sravan survives the murderous attack on him. But he is totally incapacitated and confined to bed. Lanka pretends to nurse him back to health. But her actual aim is to escape with all his wealth. Lanka manages to poison Sravan and his daughter Saya. Thinking Sravan is dead, Lanka tried to leave, but to her shock, Sravan is not dead. He manages to grab her and spits the remaining poison into her mouth by kissing her. They both die together as a result.

Cast 
 Suresh Gopi as Captain Sravan
 Mamta Mohandas as Lanka 
 Subair 
 Raveendran
T. P. Madhavan
 Manuraj
 Sargo Vijayan
 Akhila
 Veda Sastry
 Archana Suseelan as Kokila
 Niranjana
 Helen
Bineesh Kodiyeri

References

External links

 https://web.archive.org/web/20120325210253/http://popcorn.oneindia.in/title/2138/lanka.html
 

2006 films
2000s Malayalam-language films
Films set in Sri Lanka (1948–present)
Films directed by A. K. Sajan
Indian Peace Keeping Force